The Collett School is a 4–16 mixed community special school in Hemel Hempstead, Hertfordshire, England that was established in 1964.

References

External links
 

Special schools in Hertfordshire
Schools in Hemel Hempstead
Community schools in Hertfordshire
Educational institutions established in 1964
1964 establishments in England